Jansankhya Sthirata Kosh (JSK) is a registered society of the Ministry of Health and Family Welfare, Government of India started with a Rs 100 crore grant from government.

The society was established with the objective of highlighting the need for population stabilization. Its accounts can be audited by the CAG.

References

Organisations based in Delhi
Population concern organizations